Sajadiyeh or Ahsham-e Kohneh (also Romanized as Aḩshām-e Kohneh) is a village in Bord Khun Rural District, Bord Khun District, Deyr County, Bushehr Province, Iran. At the 2011 census, its population was 210, in 49 families.

References 

Populated places in Deyr County